Cebu City's 2nd congressional district is one of the two congressional districts of the Philippines in the city of Cebu. It has been represented in the House of Representatives of the Philippines since 1987. The district consists of thirty four barangays of the city locally referred to as the "South District". It is currently represented in the 19th Congress by Eduardo Rama Jr. of the PDP-Laban.

Representation history

Election results

2019

2016

2013

2010

2007

See also
Legislative districts of Cebu City

References

Congressional districts of the Philippines
Politics of Cebu City
1987 establishments in the Philippines
Congressional districts of Central Visayas
Constituencies established in 1987